The women's 100 metres event at the 1928 Olympic Games took place between July 30 & July 31.

Results

Heats

Heat 1

Heat 2

Heat 3

Heat 4

Heat 5

Heat 6

Heat 7

Heat 8

Heat 9

Semifinals

Semifinal 1

Semifinal 2

Semifinal 3

Final

References

Women's 100 metre
100 metres at the Olympics
1928 in women's athletics
Ath